Christopher Turnor may refer to:
 Christopher Turnor (judge) (1607–1675), English judge in the time of Charles II
 Christopher Turnor (MP) (1809–1886), English Member of Parliament for South Lincolnshire
 Christopher Hatton Turnor (1873–1940), English architect and social reformer

See also
Christopher Turner (disambiguation)